Khirbet Abu Hamdan is a Syrian village in the Safita District in Tartous Governorate. According to the Syria Central Bureau of Statistics (CBS), Khirbet Abu Hamdan had a population of 925 in the 2004 census.

References

Alawite communities in Syria
Populated places in Safita District